Sydney Anderson (1881–1948) was a lawyer and politician from Minnesota

Sydney or Syd Anderson may also refer to:
Sydney Anderson (Northern Ireland politician) (born 1949), Northern Ireland politician
Syd Anderson (footballer, born 1884) (1884–1954), Australian footballer for Melbourne
Syd Anderson (footballer, born 1918) (1918–1944), Australian footballer for Melbourne, RAAF flying officer
Syd Anderson (footballer, born 1949), Australian footballer for South Melbourne